Douglas O. Linder is an American author, narrator, and historian. He is the creator of the Famous Trials website (since 1995) hosted by University of Missouri, which covers over 50 famous trials throughout history. Linder has coauthored a research analysis The Happy Lawyer with Nancy Levit about the challenges facing the legal profession, as well as The Good Lawyer published by Oxford in 2014.

Education
Linder was raised in Mankato, Minnesota.

Linder is a professor at the University of Missouri-Kansas City School of Law. He attended Gustavus Adolphus College in St. Peter, Minnesota as an undergraduate, majoring in mathematics, before graduating from Stanford Law School with a Juris Doctor degree.

Work
In 1996, Linder developed two casebook websites, Exploring Constitutional Law and Exploring First Amendment Law.

Linder was interviewed by CNN about the legacy of the Scopes Trial.

In December 2017, Linder gives a lecture that tells the story behind the 2021 movie The Last Duel. Unlike the Burr–Hamilton duel in 1804, the 1386 duel was a court-approved duel, that is, "judicial duel."

Bibliography
 The Trial of Sacco and Vanzetti
 The Monkey Trial
 The Trial of Socrates, 2002, regarding the trial of Socrates

References

External links
Famous Trials website
Other websites created by Linder
Doug Linder Bio Page

American legal writers
University of Missouri–Kansas City faculty
Living people
Year of birth missing (living people)
Gustavus Adolphus College alumni
Stanford Law School alumni